Moore Island is an uninhabited island in the Qikiqtaaluk Region, Nunavut, Canada. It is a member of the Belcher Islands group in Hudson Bay.

Other islands in the immediate vicinity include Ney Island and Renouf Island.

It is named in honour of Elwood S. Moore, Professor of Geology at Pennsylvania State University, and Fellow of the American Geographical Society.

References

Belcher Islands
Islands of Hudson Bay
Uninhabited islands of Qikiqtaaluk Region